Liam Richard Finn (born 2 November 1983) is a former rugby league footballer. He is the current head coach of Dewsbury Rams.

Background
Finn was born in Halifax, West Yorkshire, England.

Club career
After brief stints in the Super League with Halifax and the Wakefield Trinity Wildcats as a young player, Finn spent most of his career in the Championship, playing for the Featherstone Rovers and the Dewsbury Rams. He returned to Super League in 2014 with the Castleford Tigers, and played for them in the 2014 Challenge Cup Final defeat by the Leeds Rhinos at Wembley Stadium.

In October 2015, Finn re-joined Wakefield Trinity Wildcats on a two-year deal.

In September 2021, Finn announced that he would be retiring at the end of the season.

Testimonial match
A benefit season/testimonial match for Liam Finn, allocated by the Rugby Football League, took place at Featherstone Rovers during the 2013 season.

International career
Finn was named in the Ireland squad for the 2008 Rugby League World Cup.

In 2010 he represented Ireland in the Alitalia European Cup. Also he followed up his 2009 Championship 1 Player of the Year award with a Championship player of the year award in 2010 for Featherstone Rovers in his first season back with Rovers.

He was named as captain of Ireland in 2012, and was later confirmed as captain for the 2013 Rugby League World Cup campaign.

He is Ireland's joint most capped player alongside Bob Beswick and is also Ireland's record point scorer.

In November 2014, Finn was called up to play for Ireland in their final European Cup game against Wales. He was a huge influence scoring a total of 18 points in their sides massive 42-14 victory. However, their performance wasn't good enough as Ireland needed to win by 41 points if they were to secure the European Cup title, a place in the 2016 Four Nations and 2017 Rugby League World Cup.

Unlike 2014, Finn was called up to the Irish squad in October before the European Cup which began on 17 October 2015.

In 2016 he was called up to the Ireland squad for the 2017 Rugby League World Cup European Pool B qualifiers.

References

External links
Wakefield Trinity profile
Cas Tigers profile
Profile at featherstonerovers.net
Dewsbury Rams profile
Ireland profile
SL profile
2017 RLWC profile

1983 births
Living people
Castleford Tigers players
Dewsbury Rams coaches
Dewsbury Rams players
English people of Irish descent
English rugby league players
Featherstone Rovers players
Halifax R.L.F.C. players
Ireland national rugby league team captains
Ireland national rugby league team players
Newcastle Thunder players
Rugby league halfbacks
Rugby league players from Halifax, West Yorkshire
Wakefield Trinity players
Widnes Vikings players